The Dominican Postal Institute (INPOSDOM) is the Dominican institution charged with postal services for the Dominican Republic. It was established on November 15, 1985 by Law 307. 

Apart from postal services, INPOSDOM offers email services for all citizens of the Dominican Republic.

External links 
 

Communications in the Dominican Republic
Dominican Republic